Lychak is a rural locality (a settlement) and the administrative center of Lychakskoye Rural Settlement, Frolovsky District, Volgograd Oblast, Russia. The population was 604 as of 2010.

Geography 
Lychak is located 13 km northeast of Prigorodny (the district's administrative centre) by road. Amelino is the nearest rural locality.

References 

Rural localities in Frolovsky District